Year 1364 (MCCCLXIV) was a leap year starting on Monday (link will display the full calendar) of the Julian calendar.

Events 
 January–December 
 February 15 – Joint kings Magnus Eriksson and Haakon Magnusson of Sweden are both deposed by noblemen, who instead elect Magnus's nephew Albrekt of Mecklenburg the new king of Sweden.
 February 20 – David II of Scotland marries Margaret Drummond.
 April 8 – Charles V becomes King of France.
 May 12 – The Jagiellonian University is founded in Kraków.
 July 28 – Battle of Cascina: Forces of the Republic of Florence, led by Galeotto Malatesta, defeat those of Pisa.
 6 August – Ignatius Saba I becomes the Syriac Orthodox Patriarch of Tur Abdin.
 September 10 – Philip of Anjou becomes Titular Emperor of Constantinople and Prince of Taranto.
 September 29 – Battle of Auray: The Breton War of Succession ends, with the victory of the House of Montfort over Charles of Blois.

 Date unknown 
 Vladislav I (also known as Vlaicu-Vodă) becomes voivode of Wallachia.
 Bogdana Monastery is built in Moldavia.
 Rana Kshetra Singh succeeds Rana Hamir Singh, as ruler of Mewar (part of modern-day western India).
 Anavema Reddy succeeds Anavota Reddy, as ruler of the Reddy Dynasty in Andhra Pradesh (part of modern-day southern India).
 The Kingdom of Ava is established by Thado Minbya in modern-day northern Burma. Some chronicles and sources however date the event in 1365.

Births 
 November 30 – John FitzAlan, 2nd Baron Arundel, English soldier (d. 1390)
 December 16 – Emperor Manuel III of Trebizond (d. 1417)
 date unknown
 Christine de Pizan, French writer (d. 1430)
 Charles II, Duke of Lorraine (d. 1431)
 Gyaltsab Je, first throne holder of the Gelug tradition of Buddhism (d. 1432)
 Qāḍī Zāda al-Rūmī, Persian mathematician (d. 1436)

Deaths 
 April 8 – King John II of France (b. 1319)
 June 19 – Elisenda of Montcada, queen consort and regent of Aragon  (b. 1292)
 June 30 – Arnošt of Pardubice, Archbishop of Prague (b. 1297)
 August 5 – Emperor Kōgon of Japan (b. 1313)
 September 10 – Robert of Taranto
 September 29 – Charles I, Duke of Brittany (b. 1319)
 date unknown
 Nicholas Alexander, voivode of Wallachia
 Gajah Mada, prime minister of the Majapahit empire
 King Valdemar III of Denmark (b. 1314)

References